Buxeuil is a commune in the Aube department in north-central France. Buxeuil is one of the smallest communes in the Côte des Bar region of southern Champagne.

History
The area around Buxeuil was settled by Celtic tribes in the antiquity. The name derives from the Latin and means literally field of the box trees (buxus=box tree; ielas=field). In the end of the 19c Buxeuil became a charming little village with an own town hall. In 1911 the Champagne Riot caused much turmoil, but the village could maintain the Appellation Champagne.

Population

Sights
Buxeuil's is home to a village church built in the 13th to 16th centuries. Other sights are the two ancient wash houses and the old pressoir of Champagne Moutard on Grande Rue. Its best known attractions are the visitor's offices of Champagne Moutard and Champagne Gruet as well as the reception rooms of many smaller champagne producers.

See also
French wine
Champagne Riots
Communes of the Aube department

References

Communes of Aube
Aube communes articles needing translation from French Wikipedia